Estádio Jones Cufune Mundunduleno is a football stadium located at the Mandengwe neighborhood in the city of Luena, Moxico Province, Angola.

It is owned by Futebol Clube Bravos do Maquis and holds 4,300 people.

History
The Stadium was named after Jones Cufune Mundunduleno, a MPLA commander and guerrilla fighter from eastern Angola.

Location
Mundunduleno is located at the Mandembwe neighborhood, around 2 km from the city of Luena, in an area surrounded by eucalyptus trees.

In 2013, the Stadium underwent a major renovation which forced the home team to play its home games at the neighboring Estádio das Mangueiras in the province of Lunda Sul.

References

Football venues in Angola
Moxico Province
Sports venues completed in 2006